Krishna Chandra Panigrahi (1 December 1909 – 25 February 1987), often referred to as K.C. Panigrahi, was a notable Indian historian, archaeologist and literary expert from Odisha.

Early life and education
He was born in Khiching, the former capital of the Bhanj dynasty, in Mayurbhanj district, Odisha where his father Sagar Panigrahi was a priest in the Kichakeshwari Temple. He completed his B.A in History from Ravenshaw College and in 1937, an M.A in Ancient Indian History and Culture from Calcutta university. He received his Ph.D from Calcutta University in 1954 for his seminal work, The Archaeological Remains at Bhubaneswar.

Career
Panigrahi was a research scholar specialising in pottery in the Archaeological Survey of India (ASI) from 1937 to 1944. He then joined the Orissa Educational Service as a lecturer in history until 1947. He then switched  careers again to become the curator of the Orissa Museum between 1947 and 1951 before returning to teaching again. He rejoined the ASI as an Assistant Superintendent. He retired as a professor of history.

For his contribution to Odia literature, he has received several awards from Orissa Sahitya Academy. He received the Padma Shri, an award by Government of India for his contribution to literature and education.
He got award sahitya academy for his biography Mo samaya ra odisha".His famous Story is Puspabara re barshabarana.

Biography
K.C. Panigrahi authored a large number of articles and books on history and archaeology.

 Bharata Prantatatwa 1960
 Archaeological Remains at Bhubaneswar, Orient Longmans, 1961
 Archaeology of Orissa, 1961
 Itihasa o Kimbadanti, 1964
 Prabhanda Manas, 1972
 Orissa ra Sanskriti o Itihasa re Jajpur, 1973
 Sarala Sahitya re Aitihasika Chitra, 1976
 History of Orissa, 1981
 Mo Samaya Ra Orissa'' (autobiography),

Death
Krishna Chandra Panigrahi died in 1987 at the age of 78. He had two sons and two daughters.

References

External links
 http://www.123orissa.com/person/person.asp?sno=22&cat=a

1909 births
1987 deaths
Scientists from Odisha
20th-century Indian archaeologists
20th-century Indian historians
Odia-language writers
University of Calcutta alumni
Recipients of the Padma Shri in literature & education
Recipients of the Odisha Sahitya Akademi Award